Dijo Jose Antony (born 25 August 1988) is an Indian film director and ad film maker, who works predominantly in Malayalam cinema. He debuted as a film director with the film Queen (2018) featuring newcomers. Dijo is also famous for conceptualising many ad films including the Kairali TMT's viral advertisement starring Mohanlal.

Early life 
Dijo Jose Antony was born in Ernakulam, Kerala on 25 August 1988 to Jose Antony and Deena Jose. He has two siblings, Deepu Jose and Deepti Jose. Dijo was educated at the Bhavan's Vidya Mandir, Girinagar and graduated in Electrical engineering from the Federal Institute of Science and Technology, Angamaly. Dijo began his media career in 2010 with a Malayalam musical album titled "La Cochin". In 2018, he debuted as a film director with the film Queen which featured many debutant artists and crew members. Dijo is also an ad film maker, making ads for various brands and corporates under the brand name La Cochin.

Career 
In 2010, Dijo composed music and directed the musical album "La Cochin" which featured songs by renowned singers Vineeth Sreenivasan, Vidhu Prathap and Franco Simon. Later, Dijo ventured into making short films while managing his full time IT job. His short films won various accolades. In 2017, Dijo quit his IT career and joined the Malayalam film industry as a filmmaker. Dijo's first film Queen became a superhit and a much-discussed film of the year 2018. It spoke about social injustice towards young girls and the atrocities happen to women who are primarily cheerful and have male friends. Dijo is currently working on his second feature film Jana Gana Mana starring Prithviraj Sukumaran and Suraj Venjaramoodu in the lead. Another project with Tovino Thomas titled Pallichattambi has also been announced. His debut film, Queen, has been remade into Tamil as Friendship, starring cricketer Harbhajan Singh.

Personal life 
He is married to Pratibha Susan Thomas and the couple has a son named David Joseph Dijo.

Filmography

References

External links 
 
 

Malayalam film directors
Malayali people
1988 births
Living people
Film directors from Kochi
21st-century Indian film directors